Milija Miković (born March 25, 1994) is a Montenegrin professional basketball player for Mornar Bar of the Montenegrin Basketball League and the ABA League.  .

Professional career
Miković started his career in his hometown of Bar, with Mornar. In the 2013–14 domestic league season, Miković played a total of 27 games averaging 25.1 minutes per game while scoring 11.3 points per game.

During the summer of 2014, Miković went on trial with the Serbian club Partizan. In August 2016, he signed a contract with the Slovenian club Šentjur.

International career
At the 2014 FIBA Europe Under-20 Championship, Miković represented his country and averaged 18.3 points, 9 rebounds and 1.4 assists per game over 9 games played. He was also the second best scorer of the championship.

References

External links
 RealGM.com Profile
 FIBA Profile
 Balkan League Profile

1994 births
Living people
Centers (basketball)
KK Gorica players
KK Mornar Bar players
KK Šentjur players
Montenegrin men's basketball players
People from Bar, Montenegro
Power forwards (basketball)
GKK Šibenik players